Station Eleven is an American post-apocalyptic dystopian fiction miniseries created by Patrick Somerville based on the 2014 novel of the same name by Emily St. John Mandel. The miniseries premiered on HBO Max on December 16, 2021, and ran for ten episodes until January 13, 2022.

It received critical acclaim and was nominated for seven Primetime Emmy Awards, including Outstanding Lead Actor in a Limited or Anthology Series or Movie for Patel.

Premise
Twenty years after a flu pandemic resulted in the collapse of civilization, a group of survivors who make their living as traveling performers encounter a violent cult led by a man whose past is unknowingly linked to a member of the troupe.

Cast

Main

Mackenzie Davis as Kirsten Raymonde, a young woman who is now the star actress with the Traveling Symphony 
Matilda Lawler as Young Kirsten, an eight year old stage actress at the onset of the pandemic who was starring in a production of King Lear with Arthur Leander
Himesh Patel as Jeevan Chaudhary, an audience member the night of the pandemic who takes care of Kirsten
David Wilmot as Clark Thompson, Arthur Leander's former best friend who now leads an isolated compound at the Severn City airport
Nabhaan Rizwan as Frank Chaudhary, Jeevan's brother, a writer who became a recluse after an injury left him disabled
Daniel Zovatto as Tyler Leander, the son of Arthur and Elizabeth, he leads a group of rogue children.
Julian Obradors as young Tyler
Philippine Velge as Alexandra, a younger member of the Traveling Symphony
Lori Petty as Sarah, the co-founder of the Traveling Symphony

Recurring

Episodes
{{Episode table |background=#0B0B61 |overall= |title= |director= |writer= |airdate= |released=y |episodes= 

{{Episode list
 |EpisodeNumber   = 2
 |Title           = A Hawk from a Handsaw
 |DirectedBy      = Jeremy Podeswa
 |WrittenBy       = Patrick Somerville
 |OriginalAirDate =  
 |ShortSummary    = Two years after the outbreak of the virus, a lone Kirsten comes across a composer named Sarah who leads and performs for the Travelling Symphony, a nomadic group of actors and musicians who perform William Shakespeare plays on a defined tour path called the "Wheel"; Sarah invites Kirsten to join. Kirsten grows up to become the Symphony's star actress. Arriving at Lake Michigan, Kirsten and fellow actor Alex, who was born after the pandemic, meet a suspicious man, David, and supposedly his teenage son Cody. They lie about their origins and David quotes Station Eleven, which Kirsten believes only she has read due to her having the only copy. Kirsten also finds hook-shaped symbols in the woods that reference Station Eleven'''s illustrations, and becomes wary; Alex, however, sympathizes with the two. The Symphony puts on Hamlet, during which Kirsten flashes back to the outset of the virus, when she, Jeevan, and Frank learn her parents are deceased via text message. After the play, an emissary from a secret community called the Museum of Civilization approaches Sarah to perform there, but she refuses to stray from the Wheel. Kirsten confronts David about the book, and after he threatens that the Symphony members will "disappear" if they don't give him refuge, she stabs him; he goes on to reference a prophecy and further quotes from Station Eleven. The next morning, Kirsten finds that Cody has taken David and fled, the latter having survived and painted the hook symbol with his blood. 

The title of this episode comes from a line from Hamlet, Act II Scene 2: "I am but mad north-north-west. When the wind is southerly, I know a hawk from a handsaw."
 |LineColor       = #0B0B61
}}

}}

Production
Development
In February 2015, producer Scott Steindorff acquired the TV and film rights to the novel. On June 25, 2019, the series was ordered by the streaming service HBO Max, created by Patrick Somerville with Hiro Murai attached as a director. Both are executive producing alongside Scott Delman, Dylan Russell, Scott Steindorff, Jessica Rhoades, Jeremy Podeswa, and Nate Matteson. The miniseries premiered on December 16, 2021. Podeswa, Helen Shaver, and Lucy Tcherniak also directed episodes.

 Differences from novel 
Somerville made several major changes from the original novel's plot, such as creating a more significant relationship between Jeevan and Kirsten. In addition, the Canadian setting of the majority of the novel is replaced with an American setting. Though much of the Year Zero setting in the original novel is St. John-Mandel's native Toronto, Somerville moved the action to his own native Chicago. Ironically, due to the COVID pandemic, shooting was moved from Chicago to Mississauga, a suburb of Toronto.

Casting
In October 2019, Mackenzie Davis, Himesh Patel and David Wilmot were cast to star in the series.  Matilda Lawler would be added in November 2019. In January 2020, Gael García Bernal was cast in a recurring role. In February 2020, Danielle Deadwyler joined the cast in a recurring capacity. Nabhaan Rizwan and Philippine Velge would join as series leads in March 2020. In April 2021, Daniel Zovatto and Lori Petty joined the cast in lead roles, while Andy McQueen, David Cross, Enrico Colantoni, Julian Obradors, and Deborah Cox joined the cast in recurring roles. Luca Villacis, Prince Amponsah, Dylan Taylor, Joe Pingue, Maxwell McCabe-Lokos, Ajahnis Charley, Milton Barnes and Kate Moyer joined the cast in recurring capacities in June 2021.

Filming
Filming began in Chicago in January 2020. Due to the COVID-19 pandemic, production moved to Mississauga on February 1, 2021, and concluded on July 9, 2021.

Release
The first three episodes premiered on HBO Max on December 16, 2021.

Home media
The miniseries was released on 4K Ultra HD Blu-ray, Blu-ray, and DVD on February 21, 2023, by Paramount Home Entertainment.

Reception
Rotten Tomatoes reports a 98% approval rating with an average rating of 8.1/10, based on 54 critic reviews. The website's critics consensus reads, "Station Eleven'' rewards patient viewers with an insightful and thematically rich assertion that—even in the post-apocalypse—the show must go on." On the review aggregator Metacritic, the series has a weighted average score of 81 out of 100 based on 27 critics, indicating "universal acclaim".

Accolades

Notes

References

External links
 
 

2020s American drama television miniseries
2020s American science fiction television series
2021 American television series debuts
2022 American television series endings
English-language television shows
HBO Max original programming
Post-apocalyptic television series
Television shows about influenza outbreaks
Television shows based on Canadian novels
Television shows filmed in Illinois
Television shows filmed in Ontario
Television series by Paramount Television
Television series set in 2020
Television series set in 2021
Television series set in the 2040s
Television series impacted by the COVID-19 pandemic